Wrather is a surname. Notable people with the surname include:

 Jack Wrather (1918–1984), American businessman and television producer
 Jonathan Wrather (born 1969), English actor
 William Embry Wrather (1883–1963), American geologist

See also
 Wrather Arch, natural arch in Arizona, United States
 Mount Wrather, mountain in Ellsworth Land, Antarctica